Hans Fritsch  (9 August 1911 – 24 August 1987) was a German discus thrower. He was born in Königsberg in East Prussia, the current Kaliningrad, Russia.

Fritsch competed at the 1936 Summer Olympics in Berlin, where he placed 11th in the final. He was flagbearer for the German team at the 1936 Olympics.

He served with the Wehrmacht Luftwaffe during World War II, as part of the general staff, and was later a Bundeswehr officer in the German Air Force.

References

1911 births
1987 deaths
German male discus throwers
Athletes (track and field) at the 1936 Summer Olympics
Olympic athletes of Germany
Luftwaffe personnel of World War II
German Air Force personnel
Sportspeople from Königsberg